Leptaxis undata is a species of air-breathing land snail, a terrestrial pulmonate gastropod mollusk in the family Helicidae, the typical snails.

Anatomy
These snails create and use love darts as part of their mating behavior.

References

Taxonomy at: 

Leptaxis
Taxa named by Richard Thomas Lowe
Gastropods described in 1831